The Temple of Minerva was a Greek style temple erected in Guatemala City by the government of president Manuel Estrada Cabrera in 1901 to celebrate the Fiestas Minervalias. Soon, the main cities in the rest of Guatemala built similar structures as well.

Temples built in the Republic 

Several Temples of Minerva were built across Guatemala, and a few of them still stand:

See also 

 Manuel Estrada Cabrera

Notes and references

Notes

References

Bibliography

External links 

Manuel Estrada Cabrera
History of Guatemala